Yap Yee Guan (born 20 February 1970) is a former badminton player from Malaysia and coach. He is the twin brother of Yap Yee Hup.

Achievements

World Cup 
Men's doubles

IBF World Grand Prix 
The World Badminton Grand Prix sanctioned by International Badminton Federation (IBF) from 1983 to 2006.

Men's doubles

IBF International 
Men's doubles

References 

1970 births
Living people
Malaysian sportspeople of Chinese descent
Malaysian male badminton players
Badminton coaches